Mehmet Nejat Ferit Eczacıbaşı (January 5, 1913–October 6, 1993) was a chemist, industrialist, entrepreneur and philanthropist, and a second-generation member of the notable Turkish Eczacıbaşı family.

He was the founder of Eczacıbaşı, a prominent Turkish industrial group with investments in pharmaceuticals, personal care products, consumer products, building products and financial services.

Early life and education
He was born on January 5, 1913, in Izmir, Ottoman Empire, to Süleyman Ferit Eczacıbaşı (1885–April 18, 1973) and his wife Saffet Hanım as their first of seven sons, Vedat (1916–1961), Sedat (1917–ca. 1950), Kemal (1918–1996), Haluk (1921–1996), Melih (1923–2004), Şakir (1929–2010). His father was the first university-educated pharmacist in the city of Izmir, who, while working at a hospital in his home town, was appointed "chief pharmacist" (. The city council awarded him later in 1909 the honorific title "Eczacıbaşı" for his fruitful and successful work. Süleyman Ferit ran in later years his own pharmacy in İzmir. With the introduction of the Surname Law in 1934, Süleyman Ferit adopted his title "Eczacıbaşı" as family name.

Nejat Eczacıbaşı completed his primary and secondary education in İzmir. After finishing the high school at Robert College in Istanbul, he went on to study in chemistry at Heidelberg University. He made then his master's degree at Chicago University and his doctorate in 1937 at Berlin University. Nejat F. Eczacıbaşı conducted post-doctoral scientific works on hormones and vitamins at the Kaiser Wilhelm Institute in Germany. These studies contributed to Eczacıbaşı's scientific, systematic and universal approach to life and business, and reinforced his belief that the right to private enterprise ought to be tempered by social responsibility. This belief was first put forward by his father, whose maxim was "give back to your country what you take from it.

Career
After returning home, he settled in Istanbul, and started in 1942 with the production of vitamin drugs and baby food in a small laboratory. In 1952, he founded the country's first modern pharmaceutical plant.

Like his father, he sought to uphold the aspirations of Turkey's founding fathers by contributing to the development of Turkish industry. Between 1950 and 1990, he oversaw the expansion of the Eczacıbaşı Group's activities from pharmaceuticals to building materials, tissue paper, personal health care, capital markets, foreign trade and information technology. He became a leading industrialist in branches such as pharmaceuticals, personal care products, consumer products, building products and financial services.

In every one of these business ventures, gis cardinal principle was contribution to "a healthier society".  Starting with his first business venture in the 1940s, Nejat F. Eczacıbaşı selected the most advanced technology available to manufacture products of international standards.

Civic involvement and philanthropy
In addition to contributing to the development of Turkish industry, Nejat F. Eczacıbaşı sought to promote and assist the development of his country's civil society. His activities in this area included the establishment of educational institutions, professional business organisations, research institutes, cultural foundations and scholarship funds.

In 1954, he helped to found the Istanbul University's Institute of Business Administration, and the Turkish Management Association. In 1961, he established the Economic and Social Studies Conference Board, which would later become the Turkish Economic and Social Studies Foundation, one of the country's first independent strategic research institutes.

Eczacıbaşı was the first president of the Turkish Educational Foundation, established in 1966 to provide scholarships for university and graduate students. He was also a member of the Middle East Technical University's Board of Trustees during the 1960s and a member of the board of directors of the Turkish Scientific and Technical Research Institute in the 1970s. He was a principal founding member of the Turkish Industrialists' and Businessmen's Association.

Nejat F. Eczacıbaşı used to say: "The meaning of life is best comprehended through the arts. The values which most exalt humankind are culture and the arts."

Throughout his life, he saw to it that every new business venture was complemented by an additional contribution to culture, science, arts and education.  Today, the Eczacıbaşı Group has become a unique symbol in Turkey of the bridge that can be forged between culture and private enterprise.

Eczacıbaşı was one of the principal founders of the Istanbul Foundation for Culture and the Arts, which was established in 1973 on the 50th anniversary of the Turkish Republic.  With the aim of transforming Istanbul into an "international capital of culture", the foundation initiated the annual International Istanbul Arts Festivals. Twenty years later, in recognition of the success of these festivals, UNESCO awarded the foundation the International Arts and Culture Trophy.

The "Dr. Nejat F. Eczacıbaşı Foundation", established by him in 1978, provides scholarships for talented musicians, annual cinema and graphic arts awards and grants to public schools and institutes for scientific research. It also publishes books by distinguished authors and is developing a collection of modern Turkish paintings. The Eczacibasi Sports Club, established jointly by Nejat F. Eczacıbaşı and his brother Şakir Eczacıbaşı in 1966, has trained innumerable young athletes and won a significant number of national and international championships in volleyball, basketball and table tennis.

In all that he did, Nejat F. Eczacıbaşı endeavoured to improve the standard of life for future generations and had the satisfaction of seeing his life's achievements contribute to these high aspirations.

His memories of the early years of the Turkish Republic and of the growth of Turkish industry are recounted in his book "Generation to Generation" (1982). "Experiences and Expectations", published in 1994 soon after he died, recounts the lessons he drew from his unique experiences and the convictions that guided his life.

Nejat Eczacıbaşı used to say that "the real measure of private entrepreneurship is the success with which it increases the wealth of the community as a whole". Dr. Eczacıbaşı also sustained that lasting success requires hard work, risks and innovation. "Success comes not to those who choose the easy path, but to those who dare to embrace innovations and advances." Nejat F. Eczacıbaşı lived by these convictions.

Personal life and death
Nejat F. Eczacıbaşı married in 1946 to Fatma Beyhan (née Ergene) (1923–2004). The couple has two sons, Bülent (1949) and Faruk (1954). Nejat F. Eczabaşıbaşı died on October 6, 1993, in Philadelphia, Pennsylvania, US; he went there for cataract surgery. His body was transferred to Istanbul, and was interred at the Zincirlikuyu Cemetery.

Awards and accolades
He was honored in 1974 by the Council of Europe for the successful Istanbul Festival, he co-founded. In 1975 he was awarded with the "Medal of Honor" by the Turkish Red Crescent, in 1976 with the Order of Merit by the Federal Republic of Germany. In 1983, the Turkish Chemistry Association honored him for his contribution to the industry.

See also
Istanbul International Music Festival

References

External links
 Eczacıbaşı Holding official website

20th-century Turkish businesspeople
1913 births
1993 deaths
Nejat
People from İzmir
Heidelberg University alumni
University of Chicago alumni
Humboldt University of Berlin alumni
Turkish philanthropists
Turkish chemists
Turkish biochemists
Turkish chief executives
Burials at Zincirlikuyu Cemetery
Recipients of the Order of Merit of the Federal Republic of Germany
20th-century philanthropists